The Vahramashen Church, also commonly referred to as Vahramashen Surp Astvatsatsin or the Church of Amberd) was built for Prince Vahram Pahlavuni of the Pahlavuni family. An inscription on the inside lintel of the north portal to the church dates its completion to the year 1026. It sits along the slopes of Mount Aragats in the Aragatsotn province of Armenia, between the fortress of Amberd and near a wall along the promontory with the Arkashian River in the canyon below.

Architecture 
S. Astvatsatsin is a cruciform type church with four two-story chambers in the corners. A large circular twelve-faceted drum sits on top of the church, with pairs of thin decorative columns standing at the edge of each facet. A conical umbrella type dome rests above. The exterior of the church is simply decorated with edging around the portal and saddles of some small windows, layers of cornice work just above the thin columns on the drum and dome, and some cross relief designs carved into the façades.

Gallery

See also 
 Amberd

References 
Ararat - Page 29 by Armenian General Benevolent Union
Documenti Di Architettura Armena, published by Edizione Ares

Notes

External links 
Vahramshen Church at Armenica.org

Armenian Apostolic churches in Armenia
11th-century Eastern Orthodox church buildings
Churches completed in 1026
Churches in Aragatsotn Province
11th-century churches in Armenia